Michał Tomaszewski (born 23 April 1982 in Łódź) is a Polish former ice dancer. He competed with Dominika Polakowska, Agata Rosłońska, and Maria Bińczyk. With Rosłońska, he qualified to the free dance at three World Junior Championships. With Bińczyk, he became the 2004 Polish national bronze medalist.

Programs

With Bińczyk

With Rosłońska

Competitive highlights

With Bińczyk

With Rosłońska

References

External links
 
 

1982 births
Living people
Polish male ice dancers
Sportspeople from Łódź